This is a list of municipalities in Bulgaria which have standing links to local communities in other countries known as "town twinning" (usually in Europe) or "sister cities" (usually in the rest of the world).

A
Antonovo

 Beymelek (Demre), Turkey
 Roccafiorita, Italy

Asenovgrad

 Bergama, Turkey
 Denpasar, Indonesia
 Derinkuyu, Turkey
 Dimitrovgrad, Serbia
 Kilkis, Greece
 Naousa, Greece
 Nilüfer, Turkey
 Prilep, North Macedonia
 Stary Oskol, Russia

Aytos

 Silivri, Turkey
 Traismauer, Austria

B
Balchik

 Boxberg, Germany
 Bran, Romania
 Cieszyn, Poland
 Galich, Russia

 Mangalia, Romania
 Stará Ľubovňa, Slovakia
 Tambov, Russia
 Valašské Meziříčí, Czech Republic

Bansko

 Kriva Palanka, North Macedonia
 Petroșani, Romania
 Triandria, Greece
 Zakopane, Poland

Belene

 Belleville-sur-Loire, France
 Devrek, Turkey
 Hajdúsámson, Hungary
 Lázně Bělohrad, Czech Republic
 Obninsk, Russia
 Popești-Leordeni, Romania
 Vigonza, Italy

Blagoevgrad

 Čakovec, Croatia
 Delčevo, North Macedonia
 Gornji Milanovac, Serbia
 Székesfehérvár, Hungary

Bolyarovo

 Kofçaz, Turkey
 Vyssa, Greece

Botevgrad

 Holbæk, Denmark
 Saransk, Russia

Burgas

 Alexandroupoli, Greece
 Batumi, Georgia
 Gomel, Belarus
 Krasnodar, Russia
 Miskolc, Hungary
 Rijeka, Croatia
 Rotterdam, Netherlands
 South-Western AO (Moscow), Russia
 Ulsan, South Korea
 Vologda, Russia
 Yantai, China
 Yaroslavl, Russia

D
Dimitrovgrad

 Blida, Algeria
 Darkhan, Mongolia
 Dimitrovgrad, Russia
 Eisenhüttenstadt, Germany
 Grosseto, Italy
 Jiaojiang (Taizhou), China
 Kalamaria, Greece
 Kazincbarcika, Hungary
 Nowa Huta (Kraków), Poland
 Yuzhne, Ukraine

Dobrich

 Białystok, Poland

 Golmud, China
 Izmail, Ukraine
 Kavadarci, North Macedonia
 Kırklareli, Turkey
 Nizhny Novgorod, Russia
 Nowy Sącz County, Poland
 Pervomaisk, Ukraine
 Pinsk, Belarus
 Saratov, Russia
 Schaffhausen, Switzerland
 Tambov, Russia
 Zalaegerszeg, Hungary

Dolni Chiflik

 Grünheide, Germany
 Izabelin, Poland
 Krynychne, Ukraine
 Vysoké Mýto, Czech Republic

Dupnitsa

 Bosilegrad, Serbia
 Bryansk, Russia
 Kriva Palanka, North Macedonia

Dve Mogili

 Altınova, Turkey
 Berovo, North Macedonia
 Bielsk Podlaski, Poland
 Bucșani, Romania
 Călărași, Moldova
 
 Prundu Bârgăului, Romania

G
Gabrovo

 Aalst, Belgium
 Chernihiv, Ukraine
 Kumanovo, North Macedonia
 Mittweida, Germany
 Mogilev, Belarus
 Mytischi, Russia
 Nowy Sącz, Poland
 Panevėžys, Lithuania
 Petah Tikva, Israel
 Prešov, Slovakia
 Shaki, Azerbaijan
 Sisak, Croatia
 Thun, Switzerland

Gorna Oryahovitsa

 Büyükçekmece, Turkey
 Cherepovets, Russia
 Myrhorod, Ukraine
 Narva, Estonia
 Roșiorii de Vede, Romania
 Smalyavichy, Belarus
 Statte, Italy
 Szigetszentmiklós, Hungary
 Waren an der Müritz, Germany

H
Haskovo

 Châtillon-sur-Indre, France
 Edirne, Turkey
 Enguera, Spain
 Leicester, England, United Kingdom
 Shatura, Russia
 Viseu, Portugal

Hisarya

 Aiani, Greece
 Aleksinac, Serbia
 Hilsenheim, France

I
Ivaylovgrad

 Kyprinos, Greece
 Longueau, France

K
Kardzhali

 East Staffordshire, England, United Kingdom
 Edirne, Turkey
 Elkhart, United States
 Filippoi, Greece
 Komotini, Greece
 Osmangazi, Turkey
 Silivri, Turkey
 Soufli, Greece
 Tekirdağ, Turkey
 Vladimir, Russia

Karlovo

 Baranavichy, Belarus
 Bryansk, Russia
 Konin, Poland
 Vladimir, Russia

Kavarna

 Babadag, Romania
 Bosilegrad, Serbia
 Çiftlikköy, Turkey
 Csopak, Hungary
 Kaarma (Saaremaa), Estonia
 Kostrzyn, Poland
 Kruševo, North Macedonia
 Michalovce, Slovakia
 Năvodari, Romania
 Padenghe sul Garda, Italy
 Pefki, Greece
 Petit-Croix, France
 Piazzola sul Brenta, Italy
 Podolsk, Russia
 Prizren, Kosovo
 Shcherbinka (Moscow), Russia
 Skarżysko-Kamienna, Poland
 Stare Babice, Poland
 Štip, North Macedonia
 Szente, Hungary
 Yuzhne, Ukraine
 Zaječar, Serbia

Kazanlak

 Alexandria, Egypt
 Blida, Algeria
 Cazzago San Martino, Italy
 Cremona, Italy
 Grasse, France
 Jinan, China
 Jungnang (Seoul), South Korea
 Kočani, North Macedonia
 Luxor, Egypt
 Nagykanizsa, Hungary
 Saint-Herblain, France
 Târgoviște, Romania
 Tolyatti, Russia
 Veria, Greece

Kozloduy

 Bechet, Romania
 Bosilegrad, Serbia
 Calafat, Romania
 Copeland, England, United Kingdom

Kubrat

 Åmål, Sweden
 Mtsensk, Russia
 Skuodas, Lithuania

 Videle, Romania

Kyustendil

 Leskovac, Serbia
 Rechytsa, Belarus

L
Lom

 Băilești, Romania
 Debar, North Macedonia
 Moudania, Greece
 Pantelej (Niš), Serbia

Lovech

 Berat, Albania
 Erfurt, Germany
 Iziaslav, Ukraine
 Kolašin, Montenegro
 Laval, France
 Lotoshinsky District, Russia
 Ryazan, Russia
 Syktyvkar, Russia

M
Madan

 Avanos, Turkey
 İhsaniye, Turkey
 Nestos, Greece
 Pendik, Turkey
 Rieulay, France
 Süloğlu, Turkey

Montana

 Alpignano, Italy
 Banská Bystrica, Slovakia
 Białogard, Poland
 Caracal, Romania
 Dzerzhinsky, Russia
 Fontaine-Vercors, France

 Medijana (Niš), Serbia
 Pirot, Serbia
 Schmalkalden, Germany
 Vranje, Serbia
 Yinchuan, China
 Zhytomyr, Ukraine

N
Nesebar

 Kotor, Montenegro
 Mtskheta, Georgia
 Pestszentlőrinc-Pestszentimre (Budapest), Hungary
 Safranbolu, Turkey
 Zvyozdny gorodok, Russia

Nova Zagora

 Feres, Greece
 Petroșani, Romania

P
Panagyurishte

 Kavadarci, North Macedonia
 Zhodzina, Belarus

Pavlikeni

 Boldești-Scăeni, Romania
 Leova, Moldova
 Łomża, Poland
 Pruzhany, Belarus
 Torrelodones, Spain

Pazardzhik

 Aerodrom (Skopje), North Macedonia
 Chekhov, Russia
 Salerno, Italy
 Al-Salt, Jordan
 Stavropol, Russia
 Thái Bình, Vietnam
 West Bend, United States

Pernik

 Balashikha, Russia
 Elektrostal, Russia

 Jenin, Palestine
 Kavadarci, North Macedonia
 Lausanne, Switzerland
 Lublin, Poland
 Luhansk, Ukraine

 Orosei, Italy
 Orsha, Belarus
 Ovar, Portugal
 Pantelej (Niš), Serbia
 Pardubice, Czech Republic
 Pyongsong, North Korea
 Rožaje, Montenegro

Petrich

 Istra, Russia
 Mioveni, Romania
 Serres, Greece

Pleven

 Agadir, Morocco
 Brăila, Romania
 Bitola, North Macedonia
 Bursa, Turkey
 Central AO (Moscow), Russia
 Charlottesville, United States
 Chernivtsi, Ukraine
 Edessa, Greece
 Gornji Milanovac, Serbia
 Jinzhou, China
 Kaiserslautern, Germany
 Kavadarci, North Macedonia
 Ponta Delgada, Portugal
 Płock, Poland
 Rostov-on-Don, Russia
 Segovia, Spain
 Volos, Greece
 Yangquan, China

Plovdiv

 Bursa, Turkey
 Changchun, China
 Columbia, United States
 Daegu, South Korea
 Gyumri, Armenia
 Istanbul, Turkey
 Jeddah, Saudi Arabia
 Kastoria, Greece
 Košice, Slovakia
 Kumanovo, North Macedonia
 Leskovac, Serbia
 Lviv, Ukraine
 Okayama, Japan
 Petra, Jordan
 Saint Petersburg, Russia
 Samarkand, Uzbekistan
 Shenzhen, China
 Thessaloniki, Greece
 Valencia, Venezuela
 Yekaterinburg, Russia

Pomorie

 Ajak, Hungary
 Gorodets, Russia
 Nea Anchialos, Greece
 Troitsk, Russia
 Yenice, Turkey

Provadia

 Bilhorod-Dnistrovskyi, Ukraine
 Rokiškis, Lithuania

R
Razgrad

 Armagh, Northern Ireland, United Kingdom
 Avcılar, Turkey
 Brunswick, United States
 Călărași, Romania
 Châlons-en-Champagne, France
 Odunpazarı, Turkey
 Oryol, Russia
 Slobozia, Romania
 Wittenberge, Germany

Ruse

 Bijeljina, Bosnia and Herzegovina
 Giurgiu, Romania
 Huainan, China
 Peristeri, Greece
 Saint-Ouen-sur-Seine, France
 Trogir, Croatia
 Újbuda (Budapest), Hungary
 Volgograd, Russia

S
Samokov
 Kostroma, Russia

Sandanski

 Ataşehir, Turkey
 Dzerzhinsky (Volgograd), Russia
 Freudenstadt, Germany
 Mělník, Czech Republic

 Novokosino (Moscow), Russia
 Thasos, Greece
 Voskresensk, Russia

Sevlievo

 Babruysk, Belarus
 Gevgelija, North Macedonia
 Legionowo, Poland
 Nanhai (Foshan), China
 Valašské Meziříčí, Czech Republic

Shumen

 Barnaul, Russia
 Debrecen, Hungary
 Kherson, Ukraine

 Podolsk, Russia
 Tournai, Belgium
 Tulcea, Romania
 Zhengzhou, China

Silistra

 Călărași, Romania
 Dunaújváros, Hungary
 Khmelnytskyi, Ukraine
 Kikinda, Serbia
 Leskovac, Serbia
 Lüleburgaz, Turkey
 Promissão, Brazil
 Rzhev, Russia
 Sakuragawa, Japan
 Slobozia, Romania

Sliven

 Alba Iulia, Romania
 Chongqing, China
 Gera, Germany
 Jerash, Jordan
 Kaisariani, Greece
 Melitopol, Ukraine
 Pécs, Hungary
 Svietlahorsk, Belarus
 Taraclia, Moldova
 Tekirdağ, Turkey
 Ternopil, Ukraine
 Voronezh, Russia

Slivo Pole is a member of the Charter of European Rural Communities, a town twinning association across the European Union, alongside with:

 Bienvenida, Spain
 Bièvre, Belgium
 Bucine, Italy
 Cashel, Ireland
 Cissé, France
 Desborough, England, United Kingdom
 Esch (Haaren), Netherlands
 Hepstedt, Germany
 Ibănești, Romania
 Kandava (Tukums), Latvia
 Kannus, Finland
 Kolindros, Greece
 Lassee, Austria
 Medzev, Slovakia
 Moravče, Slovenia
 Næstved, Denmark
 Nagycenk, Hungary
 Nadur, Malta
 Ockelbo, Sweden
 Pano Lefkara, Cyprus
 Põlva, Estonia
 Samuel (Soure), Portugal
 Starý Poddvorov, Czech Republic
 Strzyżów, Poland
 Tisno, Croatia
 Troisvierges, Bulgaria
 Žagarė (Joniškis), Lithuania

Smolyan

 Controguerra, Italy
 Gostivar, North Macedonia
 Kispest (Budapest), Hungary
 Martinsicuro, Italy
 Michurinsk, Russia
 Motril, Spain
 Pendik, Turkey
 Suhl, Germany
 Võru, Estonia
 Xanthi, Greece
 Yalova, Turkey

Sofia

 Algiers, Algeria
 Amman, Jordan
 Ankara, Turkey
 Bucharest, Romania
 Doha, Qatar
 Ho Chi Minh City, Vietnam
 Kyiv, Ukraine
 Pittsburgh, United States
 Shanghai, China
 Tel Aviv, Israel
 Tbilisi, Georgia
 Zagreb, Croatia

Sozopol

 Alushta, Ukraine
 Sighișoara, Romania

Stara Zagora

 Barreiro, Portugal

 Larissa, Greece
 Radom, Poland
 Samara, Russia
 Yueyang, China

Strelcha

 Bleicherode, Germany
 Călimănești, Romania

 Orneta, Poland
 Ulaanbaatar, Mongolia
 Yessentuki, Russia

Strumyani

 Kuşadası, Turkey
 Târgu Mureș, Romania

Sungurlare
 Jastrebarsko, Croatia

Svilengrad

 Didymoteicho, Greece
 Feres, Greece
 Lefortovo (Moscow), Russia
 Oebisfelde-Weferlingen, Germany
 Soufli, Greece
 Uzunköprü, Turkey

Svishtov

 Barcelos, Portugal
 Bijelo Polje, Montenegro
 Dębica, Poland 
 Frigento, Italy
 Hrubieszów, Poland
 Ismailia, Egypt
 Kapuvár, Hungary
 Kremenchuk, Ukraine
 Ludza, Latvia
 Nafpaktos, Greece
 Prijepolje, Serbia

 Veles, North Macedonia
 Videle, Romania
 Zheleznogorsk, Russia

Svoge

 Novi Grad, Bosnia and Herzegovina
 Stupava, Slovakia

T
Targovishte

 Bolhrad, Ukraine
 Cottbus, Germany
 Kozani, Greece
 Santa Maria da Feira, Portugal
 Smolensk, Russia

 Târgoviște, Romania
 Waterloo, United States

Troyan

 Dojran, North Macedonia
 Ellwangen, Germany
 Pernes-les-Fontaines, France
 Vigneux-sur-Seine, France

Tryavna is a member of the Douzelage, a town twinning association of towns across the European Union. Tryavna also has three other twin towns.

Douzelage
 Agros, Cyprus
 Altea, Spain
 Asikkala, Finland
 Bad Kötzting, Germany
 Bellagio, Italy
 Bundoran, Ireland
 Chojna, Poland
 Granville, France
 Holstebro, Denmark
 Houffalize, Belgium
 Judenburg, Austria
 Kőszeg, Hungary
 Marsaskala, Malta
 Meerssen, Netherlands
 Niederanven, Luxembourg
 Oxelösund, Sweden
 Preveza, Greece
 Rokiškis, Lithuania
 Rovinj, Croatia
 Sesimbra, Portugal
 Sherborne, England, United Kingdom
 Sigulda, Latvia
 Siret, Romania
 Škofja Loka, Slovenia
 Sušice, Czech Republic
 Türi, Estonia
 Zvolen, Slovakia
Other
 Brienz, Switzerland
 Vinica, North Macedonia
 Żyrardów, Poland

Tundzha

 Madaba, Jordan
 Slonim, Belarus
 Warta, Poland

Tvarditsa
 Soroksár (Budapest), Hungary

V
Varna

 Aalborg, Denmark
 Aqaba, Jordan
 Cape Town, South Africa
 Dordrecht, Netherlands
 Kharkiv, Ukraine
 Malmö, Sweden
 Ningbo, China
 Novorossiysk, Russia
 Novosibirsk, Russia
 Odesa, Ukraine
 Piraeus, Greece
 Rostock, Germany
 Surabaya, Indonesia
 Turku, Finland
 Urmia, Iran

Veliko Tarnovo

 Asti, Italy
 Bitola, North Macedonia
 Braga, Portugal
 Bursa, Turkey
 Cetinje, Montenegro
 Colonia Tovar, Venezuela
 Iaşi, Romania
 Al-Karak, Jordan
 Niš, Serbia
 Serres, Greece
 Tarxien, Malta
 Toledo, Spain
 Tver, Russia

Velingrad

 Maladzyechna, Belarus
 Silivri, Turkey
 Stupino, Russia
 Yakutsk, Russia

Vidin

 Calafat, Romania
 Demre, Turkey
 Hódmezővásárhely, Hungary
 Rivne, Ukraine
 West Carrollton, United States
 Zaječar, Serbia

Vratsa

 Bor, Serbia
 Craiova, Romania
 Frankfurt an der Oder, Germany
 Kičevo, North Macedonia
 Kobryn, Belarus
 Serpukhov, Russia
 Sumy, Ukraine
 Villeneuve-le-Roi, France

Y
Yambol

 Berdyansk, Ukraine
 Edirne, Turkey
 Izhevsk, Russia
 Sieradz, Poland
 Târgu-Jiu, Romania
 Villejuif, France

Z
Zlatograd
 Chrysoupoli, Greece

References

Bulgaria
Lists of populated places in Bulgaria
Foreign relations of Bulgaria
Cities in Bulgaria